This is a list of members of the South Australian House of Assembly from 1899 to 1902, as elected at the 1899 colonial election:

The Federation of Australia occurred on 1 January 1901, resulting in South Australia changing from a colony to a state of the new nation during this term of parliament. Seven members of the House of Assembly were elected to the new Parliament of Australia at the 1901 federal election, resulting in by-elections for their state seats.

 Encounter Bay MHA Charles Tucker was unseated by the Court of Disputed Returns on 6 July 1899. He was re-elected at the resulting by-election on 29 July.
 West Adelaide MHA Charles Kingston resigned on 7 February 1900. Bill Denny won the resulting by-election on 17 March.
 Northern Territory MHA Walter Griffiths died on 4 September 1900. Charles Edward Herbert won the resulting by-election on 20 October.
 West Adelaide MHA Lee Batchelor vacated his seat when he was seated in the first Parliament of Australia on 9 May 1901. Francis Bernard Keogh won the resulting by-election on 1 June.
 North Adelaide MHA Paddy Glynn vacated his seat when he was seated in the first Parliament of Australia on 9 May 1901. Hugh Robert Dixson won the resulting by-election on 1 June.
 Barossa MHA John Downer vacated his seat when he was seated in the first Parliament of Australia on 9 May 1901. E. H. Coombe won the resulting by-election on 8 June.
 Burra MHA Frederick Holder vacated his seat when he was seated in the first Parliament of Australia on 9 May 1901. William Russell won the resulting by-election on 8 June.
 Gumeracha MHA Thomas Playford vacated his seat when he was seated in the first Parliament of Australia on 9 May 1901. William Jamieson won the resulting by-election on 1 June.
 Flinders MHA Alexander Poynton vacated his seat when he was seated in the first Parliament of Australia on 9 May 1901. William Tennant Mortlock won the resulting by-election on 8 June.
 Northern Territory MHA Vaiben Louis Solomon vacated his seat when he was seated in the first Parliament of Australia on 9 May 1901. Samuel James Mitchell won the resulting by-election on 15 June.
 Wallaroo MHA Henry Allerdale Grainger resigned on 30 May 1901. John Verran won the resulting by-election on 22 June.
 West Torrens MHA Frank Hourigan died on 1 December 1901. No by-election was held before the 1902 election.

References

External links
History of South Australian elections 1857–2006, volume 1: ECSA

Members of South Australian parliaments by term
19th-century Australian politicians